Emma Wing Sum Jones (born 8 August 2002) is an English cricketer who currently plays for Essex and South East Stars. An all-rounder, she is a right-arm medium bowler and right-handed batter. Jones has links to Hong Kong, but turned down the chance to play for their national side, instead hoping to play for England.

Early life
Jones was born on 8 August 2002 in Hatfield, Hertfordshire.

Domestic career
Jones made her county debut in 2017, for Hertfordshire against the Netherlands, in which she scored 17 runs and bowled six overs. She was later part of the age-group county setups at Hertfordshire and Essex, Jones played her first match for the senior Essex team against the United States in 2019. She appeared in four matches in Essex's Women's London Championship campaign in 2020. She played every match for Essex in the 2021 Women's Twenty20 Cup, scoring 36 runs and taking 3 wickets. She played three matches in the 2022 Women's Twenty20 Cup, scoring 14 runs and taking two wickets.

In 2021, Jones was named as part of the South East Stars squad for their upcoming season. She made her debut for the side in the opening match of the Charlotte Edwards Cup, against Lightning. She went on to play every match as her side went on to win the competition, and hit her Twenty20 high score of 46* from 27 balls in a match against Central Sparks. She also played three matches in the Rachael Heyhoe Flint Trophy, scoring 33 runs and taking 1 wicket. Jones was also signed by Oval Invincibles during The Hundred season, but did not play a match for the side. She played six matches for South East Stars in the 2022 Charlotte Edwards Cup, scoring 52 runs and taking two wickets. She was again signed by the Oval Invincibles for the 2022 season of The Hundred, but was later forced to withdraw due to injury. At the end of the 2022 season, it was announced that Jones had signed her first professional contract with South East Stars.

References

External links

2002 births
People from Hatfield, Hertfordshire
Living people
Hertfordshire women cricketers
Essex women cricketers
South East Stars cricketers